Derbyshire County Cricket Club in 1887 was the cricket season when the English club Derbyshire had been playing for sixteen years and was the last season before they lost first class status for seven years.

1887 season

Derbyshire played two county matches each against Lancashire, Yorkshire and Surrey, and one against MCC. They lost all these matches and as a result Wisden decided not to accord them first class status in the following year. However they also played three non first class matches against Essex and Leicestershire and won all three.

The captain for the year was William Chatterton who also played for MCC during the season. The top scorer was George Davidson who also  took most wickets.

During the season Derbyshire played their first home fixture away from the County Ground, when they played Lancashire at the Recreation Ground, Long Eaton. This was the only occasion on which they used the venue.

Two important players made their debut in the season whose performance came to the fore once Derbyshire regained first-class status. They were John Hulme who took over 550 wickets for Derbyshre and Bill Storer who was one of the club's long-serving wicket-keepers.  Harry Bagshaw who also made his debut gave the club many years service. Other players who made their debut were George Ratcliffe, Joseph Marshall,  Henry Street and William Walton. None of these had the chance to play first class cricket for Derbyshire again although some appeared occasionally for the club in the intervening years.

A number of players appeared for Derbyshire for the last time this season. These included Edmund Maynard a former captain and George Barrington who had both joined in 1880. Also departing were Henry Slater who had been a member of the side since 1882 and  Edwin Coup who had joined the club in 1885. In addition Thomas Mycroft a stand-in wicket-keeper who had made occasional appearances since 1877 played his last game. Several cricketers continued playing for Derbyshire but had stopped playing by the time the club reached first class status again in 1894. These were James Disney wicket-keeper since 1881, George Ratcliffe, Joseph Marshall, William Walton, three of the players who made their debut in 1887 and William Cropper who died in 1889 as a result of an unfortunate football accident.

Matches

Statistics

First-class batting averages

Chatterton also played five matches for MCC during the season.

(a) Figures recalculated to exclude non Derbyshire matches

First-class bowling averages

(a) Figures recalculated to exclude non Derbyshire matches

Wicket keeping

James Disney Catches 12 Stumping 1

See also
Derbyshire County Cricket Club seasons
1887 English cricket season

References

1887 in English cricket
Derbyshire County Cricket Club seasons
English cricket seasons in the 19th century